In mathematics, the field with one element is a suggestive name for an object that should behave similarly to a finite field with a single element, if such a field could exist. This object is denoted F1, or, in a French–English pun, Fun. The name "field with one element" and the notation F1 are only suggestive, as there is no field with one element in classical abstract algebra. Instead, F1 refers to the idea that there should be a way to replace sets and operations, the traditional building blocks for abstract algebra, with other, more flexible objects. Many theories of F1 have been proposed, but it is not clear which, if any, of them give F1 all the desired properties. While there is still no field with a single element in these theories, there is a field-like object whose characteristic is one.

Most proposed theories of F1 replace abstract algebra entirely. Mathematical objects such as vector spaces and polynomial rings can be carried over into these new theories by mimicking their abstract properties. This allows the development of commutative algebra and algebraic geometry on new foundations. One of the defining features of theories of F1 is that these new foundations allow more objects than classical abstract algebra, one of which behaves like a field of characteristic one.

F1 has been connected to noncommutative geometry and to a possible proof of the Riemann hypothesis.

History
In 1957, Jacques Tits introduced the theory of buildings, which relate algebraic groups to abstract simplicial complexes. One of the assumptions is a non-triviality condition: If the building is an n-dimensional abstract simplicial complex, and if , then every k-simplex of the building must be contained in at least three n-simplices. This is analogous to the condition in classical projective geometry that a line must contain at least three points. However, there are degenerate geometries that satisfy all the conditions to be a projective geometry except that the lines admit only two points. The analogous objects in the theory of buildings are called apartments. Apartments play such a constituent role in the theory of buildings that Tits conjectured the existence of a theory of projective geometry in which the degenerate geometries would have equal standing with the classical ones. This geometry would take place, he said, over a field of characteristic one. Using this analogy it was possible to describe some of the elementary properties of F1, but it was not possible to construct it.

After Tits' initial observations, little progress was made until the early 1990s. In the late 1980s, Alexander Smirnov gave a series of talks in which he conjectured that the Riemann hypothesis could be proven by considering the integers as a curve over a field with one element. By 1991, Smirnov had taken some steps towards algebraic geometry over F1, introducing extensions of F1 and using them to handle the projective line P1 over F1. Algebraic numbers were treated as maps to this P1, and conjectural approximations to the Riemann–Hurwitz formula for these maps were suggested. These approximations imply very profound assertions like the abc conjecture. The extensions of F1 later on were denoted as Fq with q = 1n. Together with Mikhail Kapranov, Smirnov went on to explore how algebraic and number-theoretic constructions in prime characteristic might look in "characteristic one", culminating in an unpublished work released in 1995. In 1993, Yuri Manin gave a series of lectures on zeta functions where he proposed developing a theory of algebraic geometry over F1. He suggested that zeta functions of varieties over F1 would have very simple descriptions, and he proposed a relation between the K-theory of F1 and the homotopy groups of spheres. This inspired several people to attempt to construct explicit theories of F1-geometry.

The first published definition of a variety over F1 came from Christophe Soulé in 1999, who constructed it using algebras over the complex numbers and functors from categories of certain rings. In 2000, Zhu proposed that F1 was the same as F2 except that the sum of one and one was one, not zero. Deitmar suggested that F1 should be found by forgetting the additive structure of a ring and focusing on the multiplication. Toën and Vaquié built on Hakim's theory of relative schemes and defined F1 using symmetric monoidal categories. Their construction was later shown to be equivalent to Deitmar's by Vezzani. Nikolai Durov constructed F1 as a commutative algebraic monad. Borger used descent to construct it from the finite fields and the integers.

Alain Connes and Caterina Consani developed both Soulé and Deitmar's notions by "gluing" the category of multiplicative monoids and the category of rings to create a new category  then defining F1-schemes to be a particular kind of representable functor on  Using this, they managed to provide a notion of several number-theoretic constructions over F1 such as motives and field extensions, as well as constructing Chevalley groups over F12. Along with Matilde Marcolli, Connes and Consani have also connected F1 with noncommutative geometry. It has also been suggested to have connections to the unique games conjecture in computational complexity theory.

Oliver Lorscheid, along with others, has recently achieved Tits' original aim of describing Chevalley groups over F1 by introducing objects called blueprints, which are a simultaneous generalisation of both semirings and monoids. These are used to define so-called "blue schemes", one of which is Spec F1. Lorscheid's ideas depart somewhat from other ideas of groups over F1, in that the F1-scheme is not itself the Weyl group of its base extension to normal schemes. Lorscheid first defines the Tits category, a full subcategory of the category of blue schemes, and defines the "Weyl extension", a functor from the Tits category to Set.

F1-geometry has been linked to tropical geometry, via the fact that semirings (in particular, tropical semirings) arise as quotients of some monoid semiring N[A] of finite formal sums of elements of a monoid A, which is itself an F1-algebra. This connection is made explicit by Lorscheid's use of blueprints. The Giansiracusa brothers have constructed a tropical scheme theory, for which their category of tropical schemes is equivalent to the category of Toën–Vaquié F1-schemes. This category embeds faithfully, but not fully, into the category of blue schemes, and is a full subcategory of the category of Durov schemes.

Motivations

Algebraic number theory
One motivation for F1 comes from algebraic number theory. Weil's proof of the Riemann hypothesis for curves over finite fields starts with a curve C over a finite field k, which comes equipped with a function field F, which is a field extension of k. Weil's proof then uses various geometric properties of C to study .

The field of rational numbers Q is linked in a similar way to the Riemann zeta function, but Q is not the function field of a variety. Instead, Q is the function field of the scheme . This is a one-dimensional scheme (also known as an algebraic curve), and so there should be some "base field" that this curve lies over, of which Q would be a field extension (in the same way that C is a curve over k, and F is an extension of k). The hope of F1-geometry is that a suitable object F1 could play the role of this base field, which would allow for a proof of the Riemann hypothesis by mimicking Weil's proof with F1 in place of k.

Arakelov geometry
Geometry over a field with one element is also motivated by Arakelov geometry, where Diophantine equations are studied using tools from complex geometry. The theory involves complicated comparisons between finite fields and the complex numbers. Here the existence of F1 is useful for technical reasons.

Expected properties

F1 is not a field
F1 cannot be a field because by definition all fields must contain two distinct elements, the additive identity zero and the multiplicative identity one. Even if this restriction is dropped (for instance by letting the additive and multiplicative identities be the same element), a ring with one element must be the zero ring, which does not behave like a finite field. For instance, all modules over the zero ring are isomorphic (as the only element of such a module is the zero element). However, one of the key motivations of F1 is the description of sets as "F1-vector spaces"—if finite sets were modules over the zero ring, then every finite set would be the same size, which is not the case. Moreover, the spectrum of the trivial ring is empty, but the spectrum of a field has one point.

Other properties
 Finite sets are both affine spaces and projective spaces over F1.
 Pointed sets are vector spaces over F1.
 The finite fields Fq are quantum deformations of F1, where q is the deformation.
 Weyl groups are simple algebraic groups over F1:
 Given a Dynkin diagram for a semisimple algebraic group, its Weyl group is the semisimple algebraic group over F1.
 The affine scheme Spec Z is a curve over F1.
 Groups are Hopf algebras over F1. More generally, anything defined purely in terms of diagrams of algebraic objects should have an F1-analog in the category of sets.
 Group actions on sets are projective representations of G over F1, and in this way, G is the group Hopf algebra F1[G].
 Toric varieties determine F1-varieties. In some descriptions of F1-geometry the converse is also true, in the sense that the extension of scalars of  F1-varieties to Z are toric. Whilst other approaches to F1-geometry admit wider classes of examples, toric varieties appear to lie at the very heart of the theory.
 The zeta function of PN(F1) should be .
 The m-th K-group of F1 should be the m-th stable homotopy group of the sphere spectrum.

Computations
Various structures on a set are analogous to structures on a projective space, and can be computed in the same way:

Sets are projective spaces
The number of elements of P(F) = Pn−1(Fq), the -dimensional projective space over the finite field Fq, is the q-integer

Taking  yields .

The expansion of the q-integer into a sum of powers of q corresponds to the Schubert cell decomposition of projective space.

Permutations are maximal flags
There are n! permutations of a set with n elements, and [n]q! maximal flags in F, where

is the q-factorial. Indeed, a permutation of a set can be considered a filtered set, as a flag is a filtered vector space: for instance, the ordering  of the set {0,1,2} corresponds to the filtration {0} ⊂ {0,1} ⊂ {0,1,2}.

Subsets are subspaces
The binomial coefficient 
 
gives the number of m-element subsets of an n-element set, and the q-binomial coefficient 
 
gives the number of m-dimensional subspaces of an n-dimensional vector space over Fq.

The expansion of the q-binomial coefficient into a sum of powers of q corresponds to the Schubert cell decomposition of the Grassmannian.

Monoid schemes
Deitmar's construction of monoid schemes has been called "the very core of F1-geometry", as most other theories of F1-geometry contain descriptions of monoid schemes. Morally, it mimicks the theory of schemes developed in the 1950s and 1960s by replacing commutative rings with monoids. The effect of this is to "forget" the additive structure of the ring, leaving only the multiplicative structure. For this reason, it is sometimes called "non-additive geometry".

Monoids
A multiplicative monoid is a monoid  which also contains an absorbing element 0 (distinct from the identity 1 of the monoid), such that  for every  in the monoid  The field with one element is then defined to be  the multiplicative monoid of the field with two elements, which is initial in the category of multiplicative monoids. A monoid ideal in a monoid  is a subset  which is multiplicatively closed, contains 0, and such that  Such an ideal is prime if  is multiplicatively closed and contains 1.

For monoids  and  a monoid homomorphism is a function  such that;
 ;
  and

Monoid schemes
The spectrum of a monoid  denoted  is the set of prime ideals of  The spectrum of a monoid can be given a Zariski topology, by defining basic open sets 

for each  in  A monoidal space is a topological space along with a sheaf of multiplicative monoids called the structure sheaf. An affine monoid scheme is a monoidal space which is isomorphic to the spectrum of a monoid, and a monoid scheme is a sheaf of monoids which has an open cover by affine monoid schemes.

Monoid schemes can be turned into ring-theoretic schemes by means of a base extension functor  which sends the monoid A to the Z-module (i.e. ring)  and a monoid homomorphism  extends to a ring homomorphism  which is linear as a Z-module homomorphism. The base extension of an affine monoid scheme is defined via the formula

which in turn defines the base extension of a general monoid scheme.

Consequences
This construction achieves many of the desired properties of F1-geometry:  consists of a single point, so behaves similarly to the spectrum of a field in conventional geometry, and the category of affine monoid schemes is dual to the category of multiplicative monoids, mirroring the duality of affine schemes and commutative rings.

However, monoid schemes do not fulfill all of the expected properties of a theory of F1-geometry, as the only varieties that have monoid scheme analogues are toric varieties. Other notions of F1-geometry, such as that of Connes–Consani, build on this model to describe F1-varieties which are not toric.

Field extensions
One may define field extensions of the field with one element as the group of roots of unity, or more finely (with a geometric structure) as the group scheme of roots of unity. This is non-naturally isomorphic to the cyclic group of order n, the isomorphism depending on choice of a primitive root of unity:

Thus a vector space of dimension d over F1n is a finite set of order dn on which the roots of unity act freely, together with a base point.

This corresponds to the fact that the group of units of a finite field Fq (which are the  non-zero elements) is a cyclic group of order , on which any cyclic group of order dividing  acts freely (by raising to a power), and the zero element of the field is the base point.

Similarly, the real numbers R are an algebra over F12, of infinite dimension, as the real numbers contain ±1, but no other roots of unity, and the complex numbers C are an algebra over F1n for all n, again of infinite dimension, as the complex numbers have all roots of unity.

From this point of view, any phenomenon that only depends on a field having roots of unity can be seen as coming from F1 – for example, the discrete Fourier transform (complex-valued) and the related number-theoretic transform (Z/nZ-valued).

See also
 Arithmetic derivative
 Semigroup with one element

Notes

Bibliography

External links
 John Baez's This Week's Finds in Mathematical Physics: Week 259
 The Field With One Element at the n-category cafe
 The Field With One Element at Secret Blogging Seminar
 Looking for Fun and The Fun folklore, Lieven le Bruyn.
 Mapping F_1-land:An overview of geometries over the field with one element, Javier López Peña, Oliver Lorscheid
  Fun Mathematics, Lieven le Bruyn, Koen Thas.
 Vanderbilt conference on Noncommutative Geometry and Geometry over the Field with One Element  (Schedule )
 NCG and F_un, by Alain Connes and K. Consani: summary of talks and slides

Algebraic geometry
Noncommutative geometry
Finite fields
1 (number)